George Earl McNeely (May 12, 1898 – July 16, 1971) was an American professional baseball outfielder and coach. He played in Major League Baseball (MLB) for the Washington Senators and St. Louis Browns. He was a lifelong resident of Sacramento, California.

In an eight-year major-league career, he compiled a .272 batting average (614-2254) with 369 runs, 4 home runs and 213 RBIs in 683 games played. His on-base percentage was .335 and slugging percentage was .354. He was a member of the 1924 Washington Senators, he played in that year's World Series and hit .222 (6-27) with four runs scored and one RBI as the Senators defeated the New York Giants in seven games. McNeely's 12th-inning single in Game 7 delivered the winning blow as Washington's American League franchise won its only World Series.

The next season he played in the 1925 World Series and appeared in four games as a pinch-runner, scoring two runs, the Senators losing in seven games to the Pirates.

At the end of his career, he was a player-manager for the Sacramento Senators of the Pacific Coast League from 1932 to 1935, also assuming ownership of the team during his final two seasons. He also was a coach for the 1931 Browns and the 1936–1937 Senators.

References

External links

 baseball-reference.com

1898 births
1971 deaths
Baseball players from Sacramento, California
Major League Baseball center fielders
Milwaukee Brewers (minor league) players
Sacramento Senators players
Sacramento Solons managers
St. Louis Browns coaches
St. Louis Browns players
Washington Senators (1901–1960) coaches
Washington Senators (1901–1960) players